The 1988 BP National Championships was a tennis tournament played on outdoor hard courts in Wellington in New Zealand that was part of the 1988 Nabisco Grand Prix. The tournament was held from 28 December 1987 through 3 January 1988.

Finals

Singles
 Ramesh Krishnan defeated  Andrei Chesnokov 6–7, 6–0, 6–4, 6–3
 It was Krishnan's only title of the year and the 7th of his career.

Doubles
 Dan Goldie /  Rick Leach defeated  Broderick Dyke /  Glenn Michibata 6–2, 6–3
 It was Goldie's 1st title of the year and the 3rd of his career. It was Leach's 1st title of the year and the 3rd of his career.

See also
 1988 Fernleaf Classic – women's tournament

References

External links
 ITF tournament details

BP National Championships
BP National Championships
BP National Championships
BP National Championships
1980s in Wellington
BP National Championships, 1988
BP National Championships, 1988